Mike Andrews (born 17 January 1946) is a former Australian rules footballer who played with Fitzroy in the Victorian Football League (VFL). 	

Andrews was captain coach of Myrtleford Football Club between 1973 and 1975, then won the club best and fairest award and also the Ovens & Murray Football League best and fairest, Morris Medal in 1976.

Notes

External links 		
		
		
		
		
		
			
1946 births			
Australian rules footballers from Victoria (Australia)		
Fitzroy Football Club players
Wodonga Football Club players
Living people